Tobias Ahrens (born April 9, 1993) is a German footballer who plays for VfB Oldenburg.

Career

Ahrens played as a youth for VfB Oldenburg and Werder Bremen before joining Rot-Weiss Erfurt in 2010. He made his debut for the club in October 2011, as a substitute for Gaetano Manno in a 3–3 draw with Wacker Burghausen. In July 2013 he signed for Alemannia Aachen before returning to VfB Oldenburg a year later.

External links

1993 births
Living people
German footballers
FC Rot-Weiß Erfurt players
Alemannia Aachen players
VfB Oldenburg players
3. Liga players
Association football forwards